The Headless Mule is a mythical character in Brazilian folklore.

Origins and occurrence
The myth is believed to have a medieval origin, and to have been brought to Brazil in the early colonial era (16th century or later).

The tale is most popular in the states of Goiás, Minas Gerais and Mato Grosso, but is well known throughout the country.  Similar myths (the Muladona and the Almamula) occur in the surrounding Hispanic countries.

Appearance
The Mule's appearance varies greatly from region to region. Its color is most commonly given as brown, sometimes as black. It has silver (or iron) horseshoes that produce a hideous trotting, louder than any horse is capable of producing.

Despite being headless, the Mule still neighs (usually very loud), and sometimes it moans like a crying woman. It also has a bridle tied to its non-existent mouth, and spews fire through its non-existent nostrils (or, in some versions, from its severed neck).

The curse
According to most reports, the Mule is condemned to gallop over the territory of seven parishes each night (just as the Brazilian version of the werewolf).  By some accounts, its trip begins and ends at the parish where the sin was committed.

Transformation usually occurs at a crossroads. Depending on the source the headless mule may have a placeholder head and mane, made of the fire it spews, to which a red-hot iron bridle is tied.

The curse of the Headless Mule cannot be transmitted (unlike the vampiric curse), because it is acquired as a result of a sin committed willfully by the accursed woman.

The transformation can be reversed temporarily by spilling the mule's blood with the prick of a needle or by tying her to a cross. In the second case the woman will remain in human form until the sun dawns, but will transform again the next time.

A more stable removal of the curse can be achieved by removing the bridle, in which case the woman will not shape shift again while the benefactor is alive. Tying the bridle back to the woman's mouth will return the curse.

Removal of the curse is a great relief for the woman because the curse includes many trials, so the grateful woman will usually repent her sins and marry the benefactor. In any case, when the mule changes back to human form the accursed woman will be completely naked, sweated, and smelling of sulfur.

A person who encounters the mule should not cross its path, or the mule will follow the offender and trample him down. Instead, one should either be brave enough to remove the bridle or spill its blood, or else just lay face down on the ground, covering teeth and nails (as well as anything that shines) and the mule will hopefully fail to notice the stranger's presence and trot away (because it has poor vision).

The headless priest
There is also a similar folk tale where the curse fell on the sinning priest. In this story, the priest's headless ghost rides through the night on a normal horse, much like the Headless Horseman in Washington Irving's story The Legend of Sleepy Hollow.  Indeed, this variant of the myth may well be just a modern import of that 19th century tale.

Anthropological explanation
The Headless Mule may be a personification of the latent paganism of some popular practices echoing in the collective conscience of a people indoctrinated with a simplistic view of Catholicism. It showcases the wild instincts and repressed behaviours that are unacceptable in a Christian society. There may be some connection between the Brazilian Headless Mules and folklore about witches in Western Europe.

Being personified as an animal implies a negative view of the character, which embodies the deepest forces that are part of the human consciousness, namely the libido, whose sexual aspect is traditionally associated with the horse, a symbol of sexual potency and brutal feats. The absence of a head may be a metaphor for the lack of reason, or evidence that the curse involved the perdition of the soul. In either case, without the head to give direction, the body is left under the power of violent passions, immediate impulses and selfish desires.

The most frequent cause for the curse is a woman's unchristian love for a priest, a vicar of Christ on Earth. This association shows the lengths the Church went to indoctrinate people (both priests and women) about the importance of celibacy.

Popular culture
 The Mula-Sem-Cabeça appears in AdventureQuest Worlds. This version of the Mula-Sem-Cabeça is depicted with having a fire for a head. It is among the creatures that attack Terra da Festa before the Carnaval Party.
 In Ragnarok Online MMORPG, Headless Mule is a monster in Brasilis Field. It appears as a red fiery headless horse.

See also
 Headless Horseman
 Muladona
 Sihuanaba

References
 CASCUDO, Luís da Câmara. Dicionário do Folclore Brasileiro. 3rd Edition. Rio de Janeiro, Tecnoprint, 1972.
 Rosane Volpato's website

External links
 Picture of Headless Mule
 The Headless Mule  in the Brazilian TV program Sítio do Picapau Amarelo
 The Headless Mule at everything2.com

Shapeshifting
Legendary mammals
Fictional mules
Brazilian ghosts
South American ghosts
Supernatural legends
Female legendary creatures
Mythological monsters